Mount Pleasant is an unincorporated community located in Trimble County, Kentucky, in the United States. Its post office operated from 1892 to 1907.

References

Unincorporated communities in Trimble County, Kentucky
Unincorporated communities in Kentucky